Mariano Paredes may refer to:

 Mariano Paredes (President of Mexico) (1797–1849), conservative Mexican general and president
 Mariano Paredes (President of Guatemala) (1800–1856), 4th President of Guatemala
 Mariano Paredes (artist) (1912–1980), Mexican artist